The Fourth Legislative Council of Hong Kong was the fourth meeting of the legislative branch of the Hong Kong Special Administrative Region Government. The membership of the LegCo is based on the 2008 election. The term of the session is from 1 October 2008 to 30 September 2012, during the second half of the Donald Tsang's administration and first two months of the Leung Chun-ying's term in office. The meeting place was moved from the Legislative Council Building to the new built Legislative Council Complex in 2011. The Democratic Alliance for the Betterment and Progress of Hong Kong remained the largest party with 10 seats. Notable newcomers to the Legislative Council included Regina Ip, Priscilla Leung, Wong Yuk-man, Tanya Chan, and Paul Tse.

Major events
 8 October 2008: The DAB member Jasper Tsang Yok-sing who was suggested also an underground member of the Communist Party of China was elected President of the Legislative Council, became the first partisan President.
 15 October 2008: Annual policy address of the Chief Executive Donald Tsang. During the address, the League of Social Democrats legislator Wong Yuk-man hurled a banana in the direction of Donald Tsang. The three LSD members were ejected from the chamber for the act.
 18 December 2009 – 16 January 2010: Pro-democracy legislators filibustered against the financing for the constructions of the Guangzhou–Shenzhen–Hong Kong Express Rail Link by raising many questions on very specific issues, delaying the passing of the bill from 18 December 2009 to 16 January 2010. On the evenings the meetings were held, the Legislative Council Building was surrounded by thousands of anti-high-speed rail protesters.
 26 January 2010 – 16 May 2010: The legislators from the Civic Party (Alan Leong and Tanya Chan) and League of Social Democrats (Wong Yuk-man, Albert Chan and Leung Kwok-hung) resigned and launched a direct by-election for all five constituencies in which they called a de facto referendum on 16 May 2010.
 23—25 June 2010: The revised 2012 electoral reform package was passed with absolute majority supported by the Democratic Party in the LegCo after hours of hot debates. The resolution for the chief executive in 2012 from 800 to 1,200 members, won endorsement at 2.20 pm on 24 June by the legislature by 46 votes to 13. Pan-democrats who supported the proposals included eight from the Democratic Party, Joseph Lee Kok-long and Frederick Fung of the ADPL. James To, who had earlier expressed misgivings about giving his support, voted in favour. The 'Amendment to method for forming the Hong Kong Legislative Council' was approved by LegCo at 13:30 on 25 June, with 46 votes in favour and 12 against. 'Longhair' Leung Kwok-hung was ejected from the chamber just prior to the vote. Thousands of protestors from both for and against the proposal gathered outside of the LegCo building.
 2—17 May 2012: Albert Chan and Wong Yuk-man of People Power submitted 1306 amendments altogether to the Legislative Council (Amendment) Bill 2012, by which the government attempted to forbid resigning lawmakers from participating in by-elections. Leung Kwok-hung of the League of Social Democrats and Andrew Cheng also participated in the filibustering. Miriam Lau of the Liberal Party carried out a 30-hour hunger strike to voice her opposition against such act of obstructionism and waste of public coffers. The legislative council carried on multiple overnight debates on the amendments with the support of the pro-Establishment camp. On morning of 17 May 2012, Jasper Tsang, President of the Legco adopt Article 92 of the Standing Order, which allows the president follow foreign parliament rules for unregulated behaviours to terminate the debate. In the end, all amendments were defeated and the Bill was passed.

Major legislation

Enacted
 16 December 2009: Domestic Violence (Amendment) Bill 2009
 17 July 2010: Minimum Wage Bill
 3 March 2011: Chief Executive Election (Amendment) Bill 2010
 5 March 2011: Legislative Council (Amendment) Bill 2010
 1 June 2012: Legislative Council (Amendment) Bill 2012

Proposed
 Copyright (Amendment) Bill 2011

Chief Executive Election and Legislative Council (Amendment) Bill 2010

Following the reform plan passed in June, the LegCo passed the Chief Executive (Amendment) Bill on 3 March 2011 and Legislative Council (Amendment) Bill on 5 March with the Democratic Party voted for the bill. The membership of the Election Committee to return the Chief Executive increased from 800 to 1,200, while the number of seats in the LegCo rose by 10 to 70. Five of the new seats, known as 'super lawmakers', would be in the district councils functional constituency, where 3.2 million people would be eligible to vote.

Legislative Council (Amendment) Bill 2012

The 2010 by-election launched by the pro-democracy legislators was strongly criticised by the Beijing government. The government tried to plug the "loophole" by passing the vacancies on to runners-up in the previous election, which was strongly opposed by the legal experts as unconstitutional The pro-democracy camp was strongly opposed to the bill, as it was seen as depriving citizens of their political rights. At last, the government modified the bill to bar the resigning legislator from running again for six months. People Power legislators started the filibuster against it but the bill was passed after President Tsang Yok-sing halted the debate.

Composition

Note: Italic represents organisations that still function but become under another affiliation.

Graphical representation of the Legislative Council

Leadership

List of members
The following table is a list of LegCo members elected on 7 September 2008 in the order of precedence.

Members who did not serve throughout the term are italicised. New members elected since the general election are noted at the bottom of the page.

Key to changes since legislative election:
a = change in party allegiance
b = by-election
c = other change

By-election
 16 May 2010, Albert Chan, Leung Kwok-hung, and Wong Yuk-man from the League of Social Democrats and Alan Leong and Tanya Chan from the Civic Party re-elected to the LegCo after their resignation to call for a de facto referendum on universal suffrage.

Other changes

2008
 Lau Wong-fat (Heung Yee Kuk), Jeffrey Lam (Commercial), Andrew Leung (Industrial) and Sophie Leung (Textiles and Garment) – Liberal Party members withdrawn on 8 October 2008, and later on founded a new group called Economic Synergy in 2009.
 Priscilla Leung (Kowloon West) – joined the Professional Forum which was formed on 8 October 2008 by the members of the Alliance.
 Emily Lau (New Territories East) – Convenor of the Frontier became a member of the Democratic Party when the groups merged on 23 November 2008.

2010
 Andrew Cheng (New Territories East) – withdrawn from the Democratic Party to oppose the Party's decision of backing the controversial electoral reform proposals on 23 June 2010.

2011
 Regina Ip (Hong Kong Island) – formed the New People's Party and became the chairman on 9 January 2011.
 Wong Yuk-man (Kowloon West) and Albert Chan (New Territories West) – former chairman and one of the figureheads of the League of Social Democrats (LSD) left the Party on 23 January 2011 in disarray which left the LSD only one seat in the LegCo. On the same day, Wong and Chan formed a new group called People Power with the former supporters of the LSD.
 Lee Cheuk-yan (New Territories West), Cyd Ho (Hong Kong Island) and Cheung Kwok-che (Social Welfare) – respectively represented the Confederation of Trade Unions, Civic Act-up, and Social Worker's General Union, founded the Labour Party on 18 December 2011.

2012
 Paul Chan (Accountancy) – resigned on 27 July 2012 to take up principal official post as the Secretary for Development. No by-election was held to fill his vacant seat as there was a pending general election.

Committees
 Finance Committee— Chair: Emily Lau
 Establishment Subcommittee— Chair: Wong Yung-kan (2008—10), Margaret Ng (2010—12)
 Public Works Subcommittee— Chair: Raymond Ho
 Public Accounts Committee— Chair: Philip Wong
 Committee on Members' Interests— Chair: Sophie Leung
 House Committee— Chair: Miriam Lau 	
 Parliamentary Liaison Subcommittee— Chair: Abraham Razack
 Committee on Rules of Procedure— Chair: Tam Yiu-chung

Panels
 Panel on Administration of Justice and Legal Services— Chair: Margaret Ng
 Panel on Commerce and Industry— Chair: Vincent Fang Kang (2008—10), Wong Ting-kwong (2010—12)
 Panel on Constitutional Affairs— Chair: Tam Yiu-chung
 Panel on Development— Chair: Lau Wong-fat (2008—10), Patrick Lau (2010—12)
 Panel on Economic Development— Chair: Jeffrey Lam
 Panel on Education— Chair: Cyd Ho (2008—10), Starry Lee (2010—12)
 Panel on Environmental Affairs— Chair: Audrey Eu (2008—10), Gary Chan (2010—12)
 Panel on Financial Affairs— Chair: Chan Kam-lam
 Panel on Food Safety and Environmental Hygiene— Chair: Fred Li (2008—10), Tommy Cheung (2010—12)
 Panel on Health Services— Chair: Joseph Lee (2008—10), Leung Ka-lau (2010—12)
 Panel on Home Affairs— Chair: Ip Kwok-him
 Panel on Housing— Chair: Wong Kwok-hing (2008—10), Lee Wing-tat (2010—12)
 Panel on Information Technology and Broadcasting— Chair: Andrew Leung (2008—09), Samson Tam (2008—10), Wong Yuk-man (2010—12)
 Panel on Manpower— Chair: Li Fung-ying (2008—10), Lee Cheuk-yan (2010—12)
 Panel on Public Service— Chair: Lee Cheuk-yan (2008—10), Regina Ip (2010—12)
 Panel on Security— Chair: Lau Kong-wah (2008—10), James To (2010—12)
 Panel on Transport— Chair: Cheung Hok-ming (2008—10), Andrew Cheng (2010—12)
 Panel on Welfare Services— Chair: Albert Chan (2008—09), Wong Sing-chi (2009—10), Cheung Kwok-che (2010—12)

See also
 2008 Hong Kong legislative election
 2010 Hong Kong by-election

References

Terms of the Legislative Council of Hong Kong
2008 in Hong Kong
2009 in Hong Kong
2010 in Hong Kong
2011 in Hong Kong
2012 in Hong Kong
2008 establishments in Hong Kong
2010s disestablishments in Hong Kong